Safarov is a masculine surname, found in Russia, Azerbaijan, and Tajikistan. Its feminine counterpart is Safarova. It may refer to

Bayram Safarov (born 1951), Azerbaijani politician
Emil Safarov (born 2002), Azerbaijani footballer
Fariz Safarov (1920–1965), Azerbaijani Soviet Army Major
Georgy Safarov (1891–1942), Russian Bolshevik revolutionary and politician
Gurban Safarov (born 2004), Azerbaijani footballer
Jalil Safarov (1962–1992), Azerbaijani war hero
Latif Safarov (1920–1963), Azerbaijani actor and movie director
Manuchekhr Safarov (born 2001), Tajikistani footballer
Orkhan Safarov (born 1991), Azerbaijani judoka
Rafael Safarov (born 1947), Russian football coach and a former player
Ramil Safarov (born 1977), Azerbaijani murderer
Rovshan Safarov (born 1988), Azerbaijani Paralympic judoka
Ruslan Safarov (born 1979), Russian football player
Saparbek Safarov (born 1986), Russian mixed martial artist
Samir Safarov (born 1979), Azerbaijani military officer
Sangak Safarov (1928–1993), Tajik paramilitary leader and warlord 

Patronymic surnames
Russian-language surnames
Azerbaijani-language surnames
Czech-language surnames